Swaby is a surname. Notable people with the surname include:

 Allyson Swaby (born 1996), American-born Jamaican footballer
 Chantelle Swaby (born 1998), American-born Jamaican footballer
 Cyril Swaby (1905–1974), Anglican Bishop of Jamaica
 Donn Swaby (born 1973), American actor
 Gordon Swaby (born 1990), Jamaican internet entrepreneur
 Harry Swaby (1906–1982), English footballer
 James Swaby (1798–1863), Jamaican officer in the British Army
 James Swaby (priest) (1862–1944), Archdeacon of Belize
 Javid Swaby-Neavin (born 2001), English footballer
 Lee Swaby (born 1976), British boxer
 Mario Swaby (born 1982), Jamaican footballer
 Proctor Swaby (1844–1916), British-born colonial bishop

See also
 George Swabey (1881–1952), Royal Navy officer